Voznesenskoye is a rural locality (a selo) in Verkhnetoyemsky District, Arkhangelsk Oblast, Russia. The population was 405 as of 2010. There are 2 streets.

Geography 
Voznesenskoye is located 56 km west of Verkhnyaya Toyma (the district's administrative centre) by road. Ostanskaya is the nearest rural locality.

References 

Rural localities in Verkhnetoyemsky District